German submarine U-464 was a Type XIV supply and replenishment U-boat ("Milchkuh") of Nazi Germany's Kriegsmarine during World War II.

Her keel was laid down on 18 March 1941, by Deutsche Werke in Kiel as yard number 295. She was launched on 20 December 1941 and commissioned on 30 April 1942 with Kapitänleutnant Otto Harms in command. He remained in charge for her entire career.

The boat began her service life training in the 4th U-boat Flotilla before moving on to the 10th flotilla for operations.

Design
German Type XIV submarines were shortened versions of the Type IXDs they were based on. U-464 had a displacement of  when at the surface and  while submerged. She had two shafts and two propellers.

U-464 was not fitted with torpedo tubes or deck guns, but had two  SK C/30 anti-aircraft guns with 2500 rounds as well as a  C/30 guns with 3000 rounds. The boat had a complement of fifty-three.

Operational career
U-464 was lost on her first patrol. As a supply boat, she avoided combat. She transited from Kiel to Bergen in Norway, arriving on 9 August 1942.

First and only patrol
U-464 set-off for her first patrol from Bergen on 14 August 1942. On the 20th, she was attacked south south-east of Iceland by a US PBY Catalina flying boat of VP-73. Two crew members were killed, there were 52 survivors. Although the aircraft dropped all its bombs without sinking the boat, she was still capable of making eight knots but was unable to dive. With many other ships and aircraft in the vicinity and realizing that the situation was hopeless, Harms decided to scuttle the boat near an Icelandic trawler, the 60 GRT Skaftfellingur.

What happened next is still open to question.

"English and Icelandic sources" on 'Uboat.net' say that the 52 German submariners were picked up by the seven-man crew of the fishing boat, put in the bows and covered by a machine gun on the bridge. They were then transferred to a pair of British destroyers later that same day.

The Kriegsmarine officially published a different version: namely that the U-boat crew boarded the trawler by force, captured its crew, and were heading for Germany when they were intercepted by the destroyers and taken prisoner.

In July 1999 a squadron of German Navy submarines visited Reykjavík to honor the Icelandic seamen who rescued the U-boat crew.

In 1942, Captain (later Admiral) Daniel V. Gallery was commander of the US PBY anti-submarine base in Keflavik, Iceland. Chapter 1 of his 1976 book "Clear The Decks" contains a detailed description of the U-464 incident with the Icelandic trawler which confirms the Kriegsmarine account. Some background: U-464 was the first of eight confirmed U-boat sinkings by Gallery's PBY squadron. Due to several botched attacks prior to this, Gallery had closed his base's Officers Club.

Hopgood expended all his depth charges on his first attack, and his single .30 caliber gun was useless against the sub's thick skin and heavy AA battery. In the messy weather the sub soon shook off our circling plane by running into a fog bank. Meantime, a British destroyer left the convoy at full speed in answer to Hoppy's radio report of his attack. Hopgood flew toward the convoy until he found the speeding destroyer, advised her how to steer, and then flew back to hunt for the U-boat again. By this time the fog had lifted a bit and he found the sub, heading for an Icelandic fishing vessel a few miles away. As Hopgood circled, the sub went alongside the little trawler and the Nazis boarded the fishing vessel, abandoned and scuttled the U-boat, and laid a course toward Germany. Hoppy duly reported all this by radio and spent the next couple of hours shuttling back and forth between the trawler and the oncoming destroyer, coaching the destroyer how to steer.

This was an exciting three hours in all the R.A.F. and Royal Navy operations rooms in England, as well as in ours up in Iceland. Hoppy's first electrifying messages telling that he had a cripple on his hands but couldn't finish it off had brought everybody in England to the operations rooms. For the rest of the morning Vice Admirals, Air Marshals and their staffs sat with their ears glued to the radio following the dramatic developments at sea. Hoppy's radio reports right up to the final one had been masterpieces of correct official phraseology giving a terse, clear and complete picture of all the essential details of the changing action as it occurred. Finally he came through with the big punch line that we were waiting for: "Destroyer is alongside trawler and has taken off fifty-two prisoners." Then, shifting from code to plain English he continued, "Personal message for Commander Gallery: Sank Sub—open club!"

We opened the club all right. We damned near blew the roof off the joint. But Coastal Command Headquarters in London were a bit puzzled over that final message, and even after the Air Commodore, Iceland, explained it to them, they considered it "most extraordinary."

http://www.vpnavy.org/vp73_1940.html (search page for "Hopgood") confirms Gallery's account. For his actions that day, Lt. Hopgood was awarded the US Navy Cross.

References

Bibliography

External links
 

German Type XIV submarines
U-boats commissioned in 1942
U-boats sunk in 1942
World War II submarines of Germany
1941 ships
World War II shipwrecks in the Atlantic Ocean
Ships built in Kiel
U-boats sunk by US aircraft
Maritime incidents in August 1942